The inverted repeat-lacking clade (IRLC) is a monophyletic clade of the flowering plant subfamily Faboideae (or Papilionaceae). Faboideae includes the majority of agriculturally-cultivated legumes. The name of this clade is informal and is not assumed to have any particular taxonomic rank like the names authorized by the ICBN or the ICPN. The clade is characterized by the loss of one of the two 25-kb inverted repeats in the plastid genome that are found in most land plants. It is consistently resolved in molecular phylogenies. The clade is predicted to have diverged from the other legume lineages 39.0±2.4 million years ago (in the Eocene). It includes several large, temperate genera such as Astragalus L., Hedysarum L., Medicago L., Oxytropis DC., Swainsona Salisb., and Trifolium L..

Description

This clade is composed of five traditional tribes (Cicereae Alef., Fabeae Rchb., Galegeae Dumort., Hedysareae DC., Trifolieae Endl.) and several genera that were traditionally placed in the tribe Millettieae: Afgekia, Callerya, Endosamara, Sarcodum, Wisteria, and possibly Antheroporum. The first five of these genera have been transferred to the tribe Wisterieae, so that as revised, the tribe Millettieae falls outside the IRLC clade. The clade is defined as:"The most inclusive crown clade exhibiting the structural mutation in the plastid genome (loss of one copy of the ~25-kb inverted repeat region) homologous with that found in Galega officinalis L. 1753, Glycyrrhiza lepidota Nuttall 1813, and Vicia faba L., where these taxa are extant species included in the crown clade defined by this name."

References

External links
 The IRLC at the Tree of Life 

Inverted repeat-lacking clade
Plant unranked clades